Christian's Church is a Rococo church in the Christianshavn district of Copenhagen, Denmark. Designed by Nicolai Eigtved, it was built 1754–59.

The church was originally built by the German community as a church for their large community at Christianshavn and served this purpose until the end of the 19th century. Today it is a regular parish church for Christian's Parish within the Danish National Church. Its name is a reference to King  Christian IV, who founded the Christianshavn district in 1611.

History

Origins
After Christian IV founded Christianshavn in 1617 as a town specially for merchants, a large community of German traders and craftsmen settled there. Although Christianshavn had been incorporated into Copenhagen prior to 1674, they did not attend St. Peter's Church like the rest of the city's German community but preferred to worship at the local Church of Our Saviour. This lasted until they finally asked King Christian VI for permission to build their own church. The King approved the plans and contributed with a lot, a former saltern, located at the end of Strandgade in the southern part of the neighbourhood. He also granted permission for a lottery to be held to cover the project's financing; the finished church used to be colloquially known as the Lottery Church.

Construction phase
 
In return for his approval and donation of the lot, the king laid down very specific guidelines for the placement and design of the church building.

Nicolai Eigtved, the king's preferred architect at the time, was charged with the design of the new church but died in 1754, before construction started. His son-in-law, Royal Master Builder Georg David Anthon, was entrusted with supervising the construction of the church, which was completed in 1759. Anthon also designed the spire, an addition from 1769.

Frederick's German Church
The church was originally called Frederik's German Church (Danish: Frederiks Tyske Kirke), and served its original purpose as a church for the German congregation until it was dissolved in 1886.

Later history
In 1901 the name of the church was changed to the current Christian's Church to complement and avoid confusion with Frederik's Church in Frederiksstaden on the other side of the harbour, as well as to commemorate Christian IV, the founder of the Christianshavn area.

Since 1991 it has been a regular parish church for Christian's parish, which includes part of Christianshavn and Slotsholmen.

Architecture

The church has a rectangular layout, the nave occupying the space between the shorter rather than the longer sides of the rectangle, giving it exceptional width.

Standing on a granite plinth, the church is a yellow brick (Flensborg sten) building with sandstone finishing for the portal and tower. Ionic pilasters decorate the portal and the round-arched windows are tall and slender. The tower stands 70 metres high. Designed by Eigtved's son-in-law D. G. Anthon, the spire was added in 1769.

The tower is positioned at the centre of the northern side which serves as the main facade. It stands 70 metres high.

Interior

The unusual interior of Christian's Church is reminiscent of a theatre. In addition to the benches on either side of the nave, three tiers of galleries complete with boxes rise the full height of the building on the northern, western and southern sides. They are all arranged to provide the congregation with an excellent view of the podium on the eastern side, which is reminiscent of a stage. It is dominated by the tall slender altarpiece, which consists not only of the altar table but also of the pulpit above it, and the organ at the very top. The ornate entrance, topped by the royal box, is opposite the altar and under the tower on the western side.

The organ stands in the integrated altarpiece above a clock face in the medieval tradition. The original instrument was built in 1759 by the leading authority of the day, Hartvig Jochum Müller. In 1917, I. Starup built a new pneumatic instrument on Müllers facade, and in 1976 the church acquired today's organ designed by P.-G. Andersen.

The crypt
The church also has a large crypt covering the full area of the nave above. Divided into 48 burial chapels, it has been used for burials ever since the church's consecration in 1759 and is still in use today. The grave of Danish historian Peter Frederik Suhm is located there, alongside the graves of his wife and son. The rock and roll guitarist Link Wray was buried there in 2005.

Burials
 Johan Friederich Wewer (1699-1759), merchant and ship-owner (moved from Church of Holmen)
 Johan Christian Just vong Berger (1723–1791), physician
 Vigilius Eriksen (1722–1782), painter
 Carl Emil Fenger (1814–1884), physician and politician
 Carl Ludvig Carlach (1832–1893), composer, opera singer and educator
 Leocadie Gerlach, (1826–1919), opera singer
 Julie Hansen (1835–1895), actress
 Peter Nicolai Heering (1838–1924), businessman
 Jacob Holm (1770–1845), businessman
 Simon Hooglant, (1712–1789), vice admiral
 Knud Schroeder, (1977–1955), sculptor and professor
 Simon Carl Stanley, (1703–1776), sculptor
 Peter Frederik Suhm, (1728–1798), historian and collector
 Cleophas Svenningsen, (1801–1853), educator
 Anker Sørensen, (1926–2010), filmmaker
 Link Wray, (1929–2005), singer, songwriter and guitarist
 Johann Ludvig Zinn, (1734–1802), merchant
 Peter Ascanius (1723-1803), naturalist

The "Theatre Church"
As a result of its design, the church has often been called the Theatre Church. It has, however, lived up to its name as it can house up to a thousand people, not just for church services but for the many concerts and other artistic arrangements which have been held there in recent years. One of the advantages of its design is that it does not look empty even if only a few people attend such events.

Gallery

External links
 Official web site

References

Buildings and structures in Christianshavn
Lutheran churches in Copenhagen
18th-century Church of Denmark churches
German diaspora in Europe
Rococo architecture in Copenhagen
Tourist attractions in Copenhagen
Churches in the Diocese of Copenhagen